"My Promise" is a song by the band Earth, Wind & Fire, released as a single in 2013 by Sony Music/Legacy. The song reached No. 28 on the Billboard Adult R&B Songs chart and No. 30 on the Billboard Adult Contemporary Songs chart.

Overview
"My Promise" was produced by Walt B. & Neal Pogue and composed by Austin Jacobs, Darrin Simpson with Siedah Garrett. The song came from Earth, Wind & Fire's 2013 album Now, Then & Forever.

Critical reception
Emerys Baird of Blues & Soul said ""My Promise", the first single taken off this album, churns along sweetly with Nile Rodgers' like guitar - swinging, punchy horns and vocals to die for! (What else would you expect eh?) This is a pop vignette signalling the return of such masters, exemplifying the band's phenomenal control and musicianship to a tee!". Andy Kellman of Allmusic wrote "My Promise and Guiding Light especially rise high enough to be slotted between classics without losing listener interest." Harry Guerin of RTÉ exclaimed "It's now nearly 30 years (yikes) since Bailey's voice went higher than the helicopter in the video for Easy Lover with Phil Collins, but the man sounds as fresh and smooth as back in the day, dishing out the funk, soul and R&B mixed grill on songs like Sign On and The Promise to glorious effect."

Credits
Arranged By [Horns] – Benjamin Wright
Arranged By [Horns], Synthesizer, Programmed By – Austin Jacobs
Backing Vocals – Daniel McClain, Philip D. Bailey, Siedah Garrett
Bass – Verdine White
Drums – John Paris
Grand Piano – Larry Dunn
Guitar – Morris O'Connor
Keyboards, Organ, Piano, Guitar, Programmed By – Darrin Simpson
Lead Vocals – Philip J. Bailey
Percussion – Neal Pogue
Producer – Neal Pogue, Walt B
Tenor Saxophone, Baritone Saxophone – Mark Visher
Trombone – Duane Benjamin, Eric Jorgensen, Wendell Kelly
Trumpet – James Ford, Jon Pappenbrook, Matthew Fronke
Written-By – Austin Jacobs, Darrin Simpson, Siedah Garrett

References

2013 songs
2013 singles
Earth, Wind & Fire songs